The politics of Venezuela occurs in a framework explained in Government of Venezuela.

Venezuela has a dominant-party system, dominated by the United Socialist Party of Venezuela amidst other parties listed in the following section. The governing United Socialist Party of Venezuela (Partido Socialista Unido de Venezuela, PSUV) was created in 2007, uniting a number of smaller parties supporting Hugo Chávez's Bolivarian Revolution with Chávez's Fifth Republic Movement. PSUV and its forerunners have held the Presidency and National Assembly since 1998. The Democratic Unity Roundtable (Mesa de la Unidad Democrática, MUD), created in 2008, unites much of the opposition (A New Era (UNT), Project Venezuela, Justice First, Movement for Socialism (Venezuela) and others). Hugo Chávez, the central figure of the Venezuelan political landscape since his election to the Presidency in 1998 as a political outsider, died in office in early 2013, and was succeeded by Nicolás Maduro (initially as interim President, before narrowly winning the 2013 Venezuelan presidential election). Venezuela has a presidential government.

Parties and leaders

Governing party 
United Socialist Party of Venezuela or PSUV – (Nicolás Maduro), partially recognized. Up to 60 countries, including United States and the European Union have recognized Juan Guaidó (MUD) as the President of Venezuela. As of 2021, the European Union no longer recognizes Juan Guaidó as interim president of Venezuela.

Non-governing parties 
 A New Time or UNT – (Manuel Rosales)
 Brave People's Alliance or ABP – (Richard Blanco)
 Christian Democrats or COPEI – Juan Carlos Alvarado
 Coalition of opposition parties –The Democratic Unity Table or MUD – (Jose Luis Cartaya)
 Communist Party of Venezuela or PCV – (Oscar Figuera)
 Democratic Action or AD – (Henry Ramos Allup)
 Fatherland for All or PPT – (Rafael Uzcategui)
 For Social Democracy or PODEMOS – (Didalco Antonio Bolivar Groterol)
 Justice First or PJ – (Julio Borges)
 Movement Toward Socialism or MAS – (Segundo Melendaz)
 Popular Will or VP – (Leopoldo Lopez)
 Progressive Wave or AP – (Henri Falcon)
 The Radical Cause or La Causa R – (Americo De Grazia)
 Venezuelan Progressive Movement or MPV – (Simon Calzadilla)
 Venezuela Project or PV – (Henrique Fernando Salas Feo)

History
Venezuelan politics was characterized by military rule for much of its post-independence history. From independence until 1956, Venezuela had 24 constitutions. These constitutions were frequently established by winners after successful revolts.

Romulo Gallegos's election as president in 1947 made him the first freely elected president in Venezuela's history. He was removed from power by military officers in the 1948 Venezuelan coup.

1958–1999

Background to the current political landscapes is the development of democracy in Venezuela during the twentieth century, in which Democratic Action (ADx or Acción Democrática in Spanish, founded in 1941) and its predecessors played an important role in the early years. Democratic Action led the government during Venezuela's first democratic period (1945–1948). After an intervening decade of dictatorship (1948–1958) and the fall of dictator Marcos Pérez Jiménez saw ADx excluded from power, four Venezuelan presidents came from Democratic Action from the 1960s to the 1990s. This period, known as the "Fourth Republic", is marked by the development of the 1958 Punto Fijo Pact between the major parties (originally including the Democratic Republican Union, which later dwindled in significance).

By the end of the 1990s, however, the now two-party system's credibility was almost nonexistent. This was mostly because of the corruption and poverty that Venezuelans experienced as oil wealth poured in during the 1970s and the debt crisis developed during the 1980s. Democratic Action's last president (Carlos Andrés Pérez) was impeached for corruption in 1993 and spent several years in prison as a result. The other main traditional party Copei, provided two Venezuelan presidents (Rafael Caldera, 1969–1974, and Luis Herrera Campins, 1979–1983). Confidence in the traditional parties collapsed enough that Rafael Caldera won the 1993 presidential election with about 30% of the vote, representing a new electoral coalition National Convergence. By 1998, support for Democratic Action and COPEI had fallen still further, and Hugo Chávez, a political outsider, won the 1998 election.

1999–2013

Chávez launched what he called the "Bolivarian Revolution" and fulfilled an election promise by calling a Constituent Assembly in 1999, which drafted the new Constitution of Venezuela. Chávez was granted executive power by the National Assembly to rule by decree multiple times throughout his tenure, passing hundreds of laws. Chávez ruled Venezuela by decree in 2000, 2001, 2004, 2005, 2006, 2007, 2008, 2010, 2011 and 2012. 
The United Socialist Party of Venezuela (Partido Socialista Unido de Venezuela, PSUV) was created in 2007, uniting a number of smaller parties supporting Hugo Chávez's Bolivarian Revolution with Chávez's Fifth Republic Movement. The Democratic Unity Roundtable (Mesa de la Unidad Democrática, MUD), created in 2008, united much of the opposition (A New Era (UNT), Project Venezuela, Justice First, Movement for Socialism (Venezuela) and others). In 2008, the government expelled the US-based Human Rights Watch, which was criticizing the government's Human rights record. Hugo Chávez, the central figure of the Venezuelan political landscape since his election to the presidency in 1998 as a political outsider, died in office in early 2013 after a long struggle with cancer. Nearing his death, Chávez expressed his intention that his vice president would succeed him. Chavez was succeeded by Nicolás Maduro, his vice president, initially as interim President, before he narrowly won the 2013 Venezuelan presidential election.

2013–Present 

Nicolás Maduro has been president of Venezuela from 2013 to the present. His rule has been marked by a continuation of Bolivarian socialist populist policies (at least until 2020), but also by a severe economic crisis -- hyperinflation  (53,798,500% between 2016 and April 2019), escalating hunger, disease, crime and mortality rates, and mass emigration (almost 5 million from the country as of 2019). Extrajudicial killings of opposition by government forces are reported (by the United Nations) to include 6800 deaths as of 2019.

The crisis has been variously blamed on low oil prices in early 2015; on an "economic war" on Venezuelan socialism waged by international sanctions, and the country's business elite; and on  "years of economic mismanagement, and corruption", including a lack of maintenance and investment in oil production.

2013 
On 14 April 2013 elections were held between Nicolás Maduro and Henrique Capriles Radonski, opposition leader and co founder of the political party, Primero Justicia. The Venezuelan election agency announced that Maduro won with 50.8 percent of the vote, the smallest presidential win margin since the 1968 election. Opposition forces said that Henrique Capriles Radonski actually won by close to 300,000 votes and proposed evidence of voter fraud. Capriles demanded a recount that in June reaffirmed Maduro as the victor. These results sparked subsequent demonstrations and protests by those who said the recount process was also illegitimate. Maduro and his government responded with suppression of the opposition that resulted in hundreds of arrests, that Maduro claimed to be in defense of a coup he was facing.

Maduro attempted to continue the Chavismo policies. Like Chávez, Nicolás Maduro has ruled by decree multiple times since he was elected in April 2013. President Maduro has ruled Venezuela by decree for the majority of the period from 19 November 2013 through 2017. Maduro has not achieved the same level of popularity that Chávez had during his presidency, demonstrated by the narrow early presidential election win. Many attribute Maduro's failure to continue the same populism model successfully to his lack of charisma that Chávez capitalized on. Chávez's opposition reported to still have large love and respect for Chávez during his presidency, Eric Olsen, deputy director of the Latin American Program at the Wilson Center reports. Olsen notes that this was not the same case with Maduro, who clearly lacks the same amount of captivating characteristics.

2015 
2015 was a strong year for the MUD opposition, taking two-thirds of the congressional sets, a super majority. This was the first time in 16 years that PSUV did not have the majority in congress and this was not due to low voter turnout, as it was at 74.3%.  Henrique Capriles a former MUD presidential candidate and the opposition coalition leader, Jesus Torrealba marked this as a change in the nation's history encouraging celebration with Torrealba stating, "Venezuela wanted a change and that change came. A new majority expressed itself and sent a clear and resounding message." Maduro stated in his televised response, "We have come with our morality and our ethics to recognize these adverse results, to accept them and to tell our Venezuela, The Constitution and democracy have triumphed", and later said "In Venezuela the opposition has not won ... For now, a counterrevolution that is at our doorstep has won".

2017 
The strong performance by the opposition led to the reduction of the legislative powers due to the judiciary's increased scope and politicization.  The Supreme Tribunal of Justice (TSJ), controlled by the PSUV, invalidated three deputies' elections from the opposition. When this ruling was not accepted by the Assembly, its powers were stripped. By 2017, the old legislative body was dismissed and transformed into the New Constituent National Assembly. This was similar to the Constituent Assembly in 1999, having power to change the constitution and dismantle pre-existing officials and/or the bodies themselves. The members of the Constituent Assembly were chosen in July 2017, during elections that were largely boycotted by the opposition, with accusations of illegitimacy.

2020
In 2020, news reports described a loosening of many socialist/redistributive economic policies—price and currency controls, stringent labor laws—by the Maduro government, along with an rapprochement with members of the capitalist community—especially Lorenzo Mendoza of the Empresas Polar conglomerate who is no longer denounced as a  "thief," a "parasite" and a "traitor".  Changes such as the return of agricultural land and "dozens of companies" to private management have allowed the government to survive economic sanctions (though economic production and employment is still greatly reduced), and have proceeded in exchange for an abandonment of political opposition by Mendoza. Another result of the economic liberalization is that erstwhile socialist allies of Maduro's government who began to protest corruption and the "extravagant lives flaunted by the government's cronies in supermarkets stocked with expensive imports and luxury car showrooms", have become victims to the same security apparatus that have attacked Maduro's opponents on the right—they have been denounced as traitors, arrested (leaders of the Communist and Tupamaro parties), beaten and sometimes assassinated  (the fate of radio host José Carmelo Bislick).

Miscellaneous
Venezuela abolished the death penalty in 1863, making it the country where this practice has been outlawed the longest.

There is a history of tension between church and state in the country. The Catholic Church has accused Chavez of concentrating power in his own hands. In 2009, in the Catholic Church's Easter address to the nation, the bishops said the country's democracy was in "serious danger of collapse."

Elections

Venezuela elects at a national level the President of Venezuela as head of state and head of government and a unicameral federal legislature. The President of Venezuela is elected for a six-year term by direct election plurality voting and is eligible for re-election since the 2009 Venezuelan constitutional referendum) The National Assembly (Asamblea Nacional) has 165 members (diputados), elected for five-year terms. Elections also take place at state level and local level.

Latest elections

Most recent elections:
 municipal: 2017 Venezuelan municipal elections
 parliamentary: 2015 Venezuelan parliamentary election
 regional: 2017 Venezuelan regional elections
 presidential: 2013 Venezuelan presidential election
 constituent assembly: 2017 Venezuelan Constituent Assembly election

See also
 Chavismo
 Human rights in Venezuela
 Public Ministry of Venezuela

References

External links
 National Assembly of Venezuela
 Presidency of Venezuela
 Supreme Court of Justice of Venezuela